The following is a list of military bases operated by the Israel Defense Forces, sorted by command.

Northern Command

Central Command

Southern Command

 
IDF bases
Israel
Bases